Joshua Abraham Norton (February 4, 1818 – January 8, 1880), known as Norton I or Emperor Norton, was a celebrated citizen of San Francisco who in 1859 proclaimed himself "Emperor of the United States" and, later, "Protector of Mexico." Though he was generally considered insane, or at least highly eccentric, the citizens of San Francisco in the mid to late nineteenth century celebrated Norton's regal presence and his deeds.

History

Biography and nonfiction
 John Lumea's 135 essays on various aspects of the life and legacy of Emperor Norton, published from 2013 to the present for The Emperor Norton Trust (previously The Emperor's Bridge Campaign), constitute the most significant body of contemporary Norton research. 
 William Drury's biography, Norton I: Emperor of the United States (1986), is recognized as the authoritative book-length historical account of the life of Emperor Norton.
 Allen Stanley Lane's Emperor Norton: The Mad Monarch of America (1939) was the standard biography of Emperor Norton until the publication of Drury's book. 
 The 2007 book Eccentrics, Heroes, and Cutthroats of Old Berkeley, by Richard Schwartz includes a chapter on Emperor Norton.
 Emperor Norton was one of 15 "eccentrics" featured in the student reader, Eccentrics, by Henry and Melissa Billings.
 Giles Milton's book When Hitler Took Cocaine and Lenin Lost His Brain provides a brief description of Emperor Norton's "reign".
 John Higg's book Stranger Than We Can Imagine: Making Sense of the Twentieth Century (2015) contains a passage on Norton.

Podcast
Richard Miller's Sparkletack series of historical podcasts includes a celebrated 2005 episode, "Emperor Norton."

Literature

Novels, stories and plays
 The Duke of Sacramento: A Comedy in Four Acts, by Warren Baer, is an 1856 play based on the "pre-Imperial" career of Joshua Abraham Norton.
 In 1861, Tucker's Hall in San Francisco featured a comic opera titled Norton the First, or, An Emperor for a Day.
 In 1873, in San Francisco, an original burlesque titled The Gold Demon featured future theater impresario David Belasco as Emperor Norton.
 Emperor Norton inspired the character of "the King" in Mark Twain's Adventures of Huckleberry Finn. Twain was resident in San Francisco during part of Emperor Norton's "reign."
 Emperor Norton appears as himself in Robert Louis Stevenson's 1892 novel The Wrecker, written with his stepson, Lloyd Osbourne.
 Christopher Moore's novels Bloodsucking Fiends, A Dirty Job, You Suck: A Love Story, and Bite Me! A Love Story feature a character based on Norton in contemporary San Francisco, referred to as "the Emperor of San Francisco" and accompanied by his dogs Bummer and Lazarus.
 The story and ideas of Emperor Norton are lovingly related in several books by Robert Anton Wilson, most notably The Illuminatus! Trilogy of novels, co-authored with Robert Shea, and a sequel, Schrödinger's Cat.
  One of the lesser characters in Charles Bukowski's novel Factotum is depicted as composing and writing the opera of Emperor Norton.
 Dianne Day's San Francisco-based "Fremont Jones" mystery series includes the novel Emperor Norton's Ghost (1998), in which a friend of the intrepid investigator claims to be communicating with the late Emperor about some unfinished business.
 Emperor Norton is the probable basis for the Selma Lagerlöf novel, Kejsarn av Portugallien (The Emperor of Portugallia), the story of a rural Swedish man so disturbed by his daughter's leaving home that he goes mad and declares himself the emperor of Portugallia, parading through the streets of his village wearing a long robe and a bizarre piece of headgear. The 1925 film The Tower of Lies is based on the book.
 Steve Bartholomew's novel The Imaginary Emperor: A Tale of Old San Francisco was published in 2011.
 David St. John's historical novel An Emperor Among Us presents the story of Emperor Norton's life through the lens of Mark Twain. It was published in 2012.
 L. Neil Smith's novel The Probability Broach in the North American Confederacy Series prominently features action set at Emperor Norton University.
 Emperor Norton and the dogs Bummer and Lazarus make a brief appearance in Barbara Hambly's Ishmael, a novel set in the Star Trek universe.
 T.A. Pratt's novel Blood Engines makes a reference to Emperor Norton through a cameo by Norton's appointed (and very powerful) Court Magician.
 There are references to "The Emperor of San Francisco" in the science fiction novel The Woman Between the Worlds by F. Gwynplaine MacIntyre.
 The character of Mr. Crazy in the novel Dark Hearts Of Chicago, by William Horwood and Helen Rappaport, is based on Norton.
 Emperor Norton makes a cameo appearance in the novel The Golden Nineties by Lisa Mason.
 Sara Harvey's short story Allegiance to a Dead Man features the ghost of Emperor Norton as one of the two protagonists. The story was published as an e-book in 2011.
 A short story by Robert Silverberg, "The Palace at Midnight", features a post-apocalyptic California with an Empire of San Francisco. The Emperor at the time of the story is a decrepit and senile Norton the Seventh.
 The San Francisco-based Rock Band Land program of classes and camps for children produced an audio story, King Bobby of the Village Village, in which the main character, King Bobby, appears to be heavily based on Emperor Norton.
 Emperor Norton is a character in Mark Bowles's 2017 alternate history novel, Norton The Third.
 Emperor Norton is a protagonist of Michael G. Williams' time travel urban fantasy series of novellas: Through the Doors of Oblivion (2020), All the Pomp of Earthly Majesty (2021), Shut the Gates of Mercy (2022), and the future fourth installment titled The Last Scene of a Strange Career. Each title is from a eulogy or other remembrance of Norton.

Comic book series
 The story of Emperor Norton was used by Neil Gaiman in "Three Septembers and a January", an issue of his Sandman comic-book series (included in the collection Fables and Reflections). Gaiman's Norton is a victim of Despair until Despair's brother, Dream, gives him the dream of royalty. Dream's sister Delirium notes that Norton's fantasy of Imperial power keeps him from true insanity, observing that "he should belong to me, but he doesn't ... his madness keeps him sane." In later issues collected in Worlds' End, it is mentioned that a movement started in San Francisco sought to declare Prez Rickard Emperor of the United States, and a figure resembling Norton appears in one of the later stories marching in a procession. In the Audible adaptation, he is portrayed by John Lithgow.
 The character of "His Imperial Highness Smith" in the Belgian comic Lucky Luke: L'empereur Smith (1976), by Morris and René Goscinny, is loosely based on Norton. In contrast to the historical Norton, at the time that he declared himself emperor, the fictional Smith remains a successful businessman. In fact, it is becoming fabulously rich that gave him his delusions of grandeur. He is capable of maintaining his own private army, which an outlaw manipulates him into using to "reconquer" the United States before Lucky Luke stops him. In spite of the drama arising from the manipulations, Smith is never described as malicious, probably in respect of the "real" emperor. At the end of the comic book, a page is devoted to a short biography of the real Emperor Norton.
 Ted Naifeh's fantasy comic Polly and the Pirates features an Emperor Joshua, who is modeled after Norton.

Role-playing games
 Emperor Norton I is the ruler of the Bear Flag Empire (encompassing the modern-day states of California, Oregon, and Washington) in R. Talsorian Games' Castle Falkenstein series of role-playing game. Originally installed as a figurehead by the leaders of the Bear Flag Revolt, he was popularly asked to remain as a beloved monarch after the assassinations of the men that had originally propped him up.
 In Diana: Warrior Princess by Marcus Rowland (a satirical role-playing game with an "alternate" 20th-century setting, which also features such "historical" characters as Wild Bill Gates and Prince Albert Einstein), Emperor Norton is described as the "benign ruler of large parts of America".

Other
From 2003 to 2011 the Emperor Norton Awards, a San Francisco Bay area fiction award for "extraordinary invention and creativity unhindered by the constraints of paltry reason", were awarded by Tachyon Publications and Borderlands Books.

Music

Operas, musicals and songs
1944
Lu Watters composed a piece entitled "Emperor Norton's Hunch", originally performed and recorded by his Yerba Buena Jazz Band.

1950s
Robert B. Aird, founding chairman of the neurology department of the University of California at San Francisco, composed a still-unperformed opera based on Norton's life.

1981
A one-act opera, Emperor Norton, with music by Henry Mollicone and a libretto by John S. Bowman, received its premiere in 1981. It was performed in the fall of 1990 by the West Bay Opera company in Palo Alto, California.

1999
An opera called Emperor Norton of the U.S.A., with music by Jerome Rosen and a libretto by James Schevill, premiered in Davis, California, in 1999.

2003
An opera, I, Norton, by Gino Robair, combines free and conducted improvisation with graphical and conventional scores, and has been performed by many ensembles in North America and Europe.

2005
Emperor Norton: A New Musical, by Kim Ohanneson with songs by Marty Axelrod, premiered at San Francisco's Dark Room Theater in December 2005 and ran there for three months, consistently selling out. A condensed and re-arranged version was presented in July 2006 at the San Francisco Theater Festival, and a revised production with many of the original cast and several new songs began a three-month run at the Shelton Theater in January 2007.

2006
"The Madness of Emperor Norton I", a song by the group The Kehoe Nation, appears on the group's 2006 album Devil's Acre Overture.

2007
"The Emperor", a song with lyrics by Z. Mulls and music by Ron Tintner.

2008
"Emperor Norton", a song by singer-songwriter Matthew Dinario (who records as The Short Wave Mystery) appeared on his 2008 album Okey Dokey.

2010
The musical Norton: America's Forgotten Emperor, with words and music by Rebecca McGlynn, was performed at Denison University.

2012
"Emperor Norton in the Last Year of His Life (1880)", a song by Chuck Prophet, appeared on Prophet's 2012 album, Temple Beautiful.
"Pope of the Bay (for Emperor Norton)", a song by the group Smooth Toad, appears on the group's 2012 album, Long Old Road.

2013
"Emperor Norton", song by singer-songwriter Steven Crowley.

2021
"Emperor Norton", a parody of The Beatles' "Eleanor Rigby" by Stevonnie Ross (who records as Sunday Comes Afterwards) in their 2021 album, "I Want a Refund."

Ensembles and bands
 Emperor Norton's Stationary Marching Band, an eclectic jazz and performance art band based in Boston.
 The Sons of Emperor Norton, a San Francisco-based band that perform vintage country and blues, Americana, and rockabilly.
 Emperor Norton's Jazz Band, a high-energy Dixieland ensemble that performs all over the Bay Area. 
 The Emperor Norton Ceili Band, an Irish dance band based in San Francisco.
 Protectors of Mexico, an Irish four-piece rock band formed in 2007 but now disbanded.
 Emperor Norton, a progressive rock band formed in York in 2017.

Other
The independent record label, Emperor Norton Records, launched in 1996 and closed in 2004.

Television
 Bonanza, an American western television show, featured an episode titled "The Emperor Norton."  It first aired on February 27, 1966, as episode 225 in the seventh season. In the episode, Emperor Norton gets in trouble after calling for worker safety in the mines. As a result of his concern for the miners, his opponents attempt to have him committed. Mark Twain and the cast of Bonanza testify on Norton's behalf at a competency hearing. Norton's suspension bridge concept is also featured.
 Telephone Time "Emperor Norton's Bridge" (season 1, episode 8; aired 5/27/56).
 Death Valley Days "Emperor Norton" (episode 376, aired 6/15/56).
 Broken Arrow "The Conspirators" (episode 11, aired 12/18/56).
 Alistair Cooke's Letter From America featured Norton as the subject of one of its episodes.
 The Emperor Norton Science Fiction Hour, a public-access television program in San Francisco during the late 1970s and early 1980s.
 Weird U.S., Vol. 3 (History Channel) DVD (2004).
 Surprise, a Korean entertainment show, aired a "re-enactment" of Emperor Norton's life in 2006.

Film
During the San Francisco sequence of the 1956 film Around the World in Eighty Days, an actor dressed in a costume resembling Emperor Norton's regalia and accompanied by two dogs, thought to be Bummer and Lazarus, is briefly seen leading a torchlight parade.

Radio
The San Francisco radio station KFOG referred to the Bay Bridge as "the Emperor Norton" during their morning traffic reports in the late 1980s [need confirmation of exact dates].

Comedy and comic strips
 The Bugle podcast, cohosted by John Oliver and Andy Zaltzman, nominated Emperor Norton for October 2008's prestigious "Hottie from History" award.
 Emperor Norton's story was featured in the San Francisco Chronicle comic strip Farley by Phil Frank between September 2004 and March 2005. In this series, the character Baba Rebop also promotes naming the new San Francisco–Oakland Bay Bridge after Emperor Norton in his honor.
 Thinkin' Lincoln, a Web comic, uses Emperor Norton as a minor character.
 Kate Beaton's popular history- and literature-based Web comic, Hark! A Vagrant, has twice honored Emperor Norton.
 Francesca Testen's Web comic The History Twins featured a five-part series on Emperor Norton in June 2014.
 The comic strip The New Adventures of Queen Victoria includes Norton as a minor character.  The third paperback collection of the strip is entitled Norton Hears a Who, and Other Stories.
 Web comic Skin Horse features Emperor Norton as a leader of the undead living in a California necropolis.

Internet
 The Emperor Norton Utilities is a collection of strange and amusing software of limited practical use. The name is a play on the Norton Utilities.
 In 1999, it was reported (via a spiritual medium) that Emperor Norton had issued a new decree which, among other things, established that his Imperial Domain now extends to include the Usenet.
 In the shared alternate history of Ill Bethisad (1997 and after), Joshua Abraham Norton never moved to the United States or declared himself Emperor but instead remained in South Africa and became a wealthy modestly successful businessman. This version of Norton apparently lived longer than his real life counterpart (who died in 1880) as he is mentioned as making a fortune making and selling carts and wagons during the  Witwatersrand Gold Rush (which started in 1886). His company, "Norton Livery Company" outlived the Gold Rush and Norton himself and in 1912, merged with "Emperor Carriages" to become "Emperor-Norton Motor Works" (ENMW), an obvious reference to Emperor Norton's title. In the present day, ENMW is now a major car company based in Johannesburg. It is actually impossible for this fictional version of Norton to declare himself Emperor of the United States even if he wanted to because in the alternate universe setting of Ill Bethisad, the United States never existed with its territory divided between various states, one with monarchies of its own. Ill Bethisad's counterpart of San Francisco is located in a country called "Montréi" and doesn't have bridges (including the San Francisco–Oakland Bay Bridge proposed by Emperor Norton in reality).

Blogs
The author of a blog titled "Strip Mining for Whimsy" wrote under the name Joshua Norton II, Emperor of the United States, Protector of Mexico. The blog was taken down in March 2007..

Video games
 Emperor Norton is a character in the Neuromancer video game, an adaptation of the novel by William Gibson. He hangs out in the Matrix Restaurant and sells the player skill chips.
 Emperor Norton is a character in Asymmetric Productions' Weird West-themed RPG West of Loathing. He rules over Frisco and demands a crown before he'll allow a transcontinental railroad to be completed, and if none is provided, he curses the player character with an annoying status effect called Norton's Ant-Eye Virus and hijacks a passenger train, forcing the player character to find a cure and then track down Emperor Norton for the final battle.

Food

 For many years, the Ghirardelli Chocolate Company in San Francisco offered a sundae called "The Emperor Norton", which had as its primary garnishes two sliced bananas, hot fudge sauce, a handful of nuts and cherries. Sometime between 1990 and 1996, Ghirardelli renamed this sundae "The Domingo Ghirardelli." The company also produced an "Emperor Norton Non-Pareils" candy, sold in 5-ounce portions.
 The Oakland, California-based San Francisco Bread Company produced the "Emperor Norton Sourdough Snack Chips" in 5.5- or 12-ounce bags. Varieties included original flavor and ranch. The product was marketed through deli shelves and, according to vice-president of operations Jill Schuster, it had a very loyal following around the country. The product was discontinued in early 2012.
 In North Beach, San Francisco, the now-closed San Francisco Brewing Company produced the "Emperor Norton Lager", a Munich-style amber lager with a distinctive malt character.

LGBT
José Sarria, a drag queen and early gay activist, proclaimed himself "Her Royal Majesty, Empress of San Francisco, José I, The Widow Norton" in 1964. As the Widow Norton, Sarria established the Imperial Court System, an international network of charitable organizations. Sarria died in August 2013, at the age of 89 or 90, and is buried at the foot of Emperor Norton's grave at Woodlawn Cemetery in Colma, California.

Emperor Norton performers
 
 The San Francisco historical walking tour "Emperor Norton's Fantastic San Francisco Time Machine" is run by Joseph Amster, who gives the tours in the person of Emperor Norton.
 Emperor Norton was a "guest of honor" at the 1993 World Science Fiction Convention, held in San Francisco. He was "channeled" by a local fan.

Organization devoted solely to advancing the legacy of Emperor Norton
The Emperor Norton Trust is a nonprofit that, since 2013, has been working on a variety of fronts — original research; education; advocacy — to advance the legacy of Emperor Norton. (The Trust previously was known as The Emperor's Bridge Campaign.)

Groups that hold Emperor Norton as a patron saint

Fraternal
The Ancient and Honorable Order of E Clampus Vitus, a fraternal society focused on the legacy of the Old West, holds Emperor Norton in particular regard and makes an annual pilgrimage to the Emperor's gravesite at Woodlawn cemetery, in Colma, Calif, on the Saturday closest to the Emperor's death date of January 8.

Religion
In the religion of Discordianism, Emperor Norton is considered a Saint Second Class, the highest spiritual honor attainable by an actual (non-fictional) human being. The Principia Discordia — the sacred text of Discordianism — relates that, when the Goddess Eris / Discordia was asked whether She, like Jehovah, had a Begotten Son, She replied with Norton's name. The Principia notes that the Joshua Norton Cabal, a group of Discordians based in San Francisco, has as its slogan: 
In official practice, this phrase is never translated out of Latin, except on certain holidays.

Culture jamming
Cacophony Society.

Micronation
Norton appears on the 10 Valora coin and 10 Valora paper note of the Republic of Molossia — which also has declared part of its backyard to be Norton Park.

Annual celebrations
 January 8, the anniversary of Emperor Norton's death, is celebrated as Emperor Norton Day.
 February 4, the anniversary of Emperor Norton's birth.
 September 17, the anniversary of Joshua Norton's public declaration of himself as Emperor, is celebrated as Empire Day.

References

Norton, Emperor
Norton, Emperor
Celebrities in popular culture
Politics in popular culture
Culture of San Francisco
North Beach, San Francisco
San Francisco in popular culture